Foresters Mont Fleuri Football Club is a Seychellois football club from Mont Fleuri, they are playing in the Seychelles Premier League.

Current players 

Football clubs in Seychelles
Organizations with year of establishment missing